RADA Electronic Industries Ltd. is a global defense technology company focused on proprietary radar and legacy avionics systems. The company, which includes RADA Electronic Industries and its U.S-based subsidiaries, engages in the development, manufacture, and sale of systems designed primarily for the defense and aerospace markets. Its product lines include tactical radars, inertial navigation systems and avionics systems. It offers software-defined, tactical radars for enhanced survivability of stationary and on-the-move operations. Founded in 1970, RADA Electronic Industries Ltd. has been traded on the NASDAQ Capital Market since 1985.

History 
RADA Electronic Industries was founded in 1970 by David Reitner. In 1998, owing to pressure from Boeing, Niessenson retired from his position as CEO of the company. Herzl Boedinger, who was RADA's international marketing manager and president of the U.S.-based subsidiary, and who had earlier served as commander of the Israeli Air Force, became president and CEO of RADA. In 2007, Zvi Alon, who was vice president of marketing and sales and had in the 1980s been involved in the Lavi Project, took on the role of CEO.

In November 2016, RADA Electronic Industries announced the appointment of Dov Sella, its chief business development officer, as the company's executive officer.

Since 2016, the company is focused on developing, manufacturing and selling software defined, tactical radar systems for multiple applications such as Active Protection Systems (APS) for combat vehicles, Short-Range Air Defense (SHORAD) for the maneuver force (including Counter-UAS), and Counter Rockets/Artillery/Mortars (C-RAM) systems.

In 2017, the company supplied over a hundred radar systems to the United States Marine Corps. In 2018, the radars were integrated into Rafael's advanced anti-drone defense system for the British Army C-UAS capability. into Leonardo DRS mission equipment package (MEP) for the US Army Initial Maneuver-Short Range Air Defense (IM-SHORAD) capability, into an anti-drone warfare system for the United States Department of Defense against unmanned aerial system (UAS) threats, and into the Israeli Iron Fist Active Protection System for the US Army Bradley Brigade. In addition, RADA opened headquarters and a manufacturing facility in Germantown, Maryland (RADA USA), to locally develop the market of tactical radars for U.S. Defense Forces.

In 2019 RADA's radars took part in various defense missions, including the knock-down of an Iranian drone in the Strait of Hormuz by the United States Marine Corps all-terrain vehicle, which was equipped with an anti-drone detection and jamming system. The growing demand for tactical radars together with the increase in sales by RADA USA, led to the doubling of the yearly revenue and of the share price.
In 2020, General Dynamics Land Systems (GDLS) was awarded a $1.2 billion contract by the U.S. Army to produce, test and deliver IM-SHORAD systems, which integrates RADA’s Multi-mission Hemispheric Radar (MHR).

In June 2022 the US subsidiary of the Italian defense conglomerate Leonardo, Leonardo DRS, agreed to an all share acquisition of the US subsidiary of RADA Electronic Industries. The new Leonardo subsidiary will be listed on the Nasdaq and Tel Aviv stock exchanges under the name DRS with RADA shareholders being given 19.5% of the combined business and Leonardo holding the remainder.

Products 

 aCHR (Advanced Compact Hemispheric Radar)
 MHR (Multi-mission Hemispheric Radar)
 ieMHR (Improved and Enhanced Multi-mission Hemispheric Radar)
 exMHR (Enhanced and Extended Multi-mission Hemispheric Radar)
 DVDR & GDS (Digital Video, Data Recorder & Ground Debriefing System)
  R-200M (Mems-based Inertial Navigation System)

See also 
 Iron Fist (countermeasure)
 Douglas A-4 Skyhawk
 Chile–Israel relations
 List of Israeli companies quoted on the Nasdaq

References 

Companies listed on the Nasdaq
Information technology companies of Israel
Electronics companies established in 1970
Defense companies of Israel
Companies based in Netanya
Israeli companies established in 1970